This is a list of international competitive video-gaming championship events for Warcraft III: Reign of Chaos and Warcraft III: The Frozen Throne.

Individual competitions

2020

2019

2018

2017

2016

2015

2014

2013

2012

2011

2010

2009

2008

2007

2006

2005

2004

2003

Team competitions

2020

2019

2018

2016

2015

2010

2009

2008

2007

2006

2005

2004

2003

References

Esports-related lists
Lists of sports champions by sport
List of